Oulunsalo (also formerly ) is former municipality in the region of Northern Ostrobothnia, in Finland. Along with Haukipudas, Kiiminki and Yli-Ii it lost its municipal status and was merged with the city of Oulu on 1 January 2013. The municipality was founded in 1882.

Oulu Airport is located in Oulunsalo.

Oulunsalo was one of the fastest-growing areas in Finland, among the other municipalities around Oulu.

The municipality was unilingually Finnish. The Swedish name is now considered outdated, according to the Institute for the Languages of Finland.

Politics
Results of the 2011 Finnish parliamentary election in Oulunsalo:

Centre Party   33.1%
True Finns   21.4%
National Coalition Party   15.9%
Left Alliance   10.9%
Social Democratic Party   8.9%
Green League   6.4%
Christian Democrats   2.3%
Pirate Party   0.3%
Swedish People's Party   0.3%

Friendship cities 
 Tanno, Japan (since 1992)
 Matera, Italy, (since 2009)

Notable people
 Saara Aalto
 Mikael Granlund
 Markus Granlund
 Janne Kuokkanen

See also
 Finnish regional road 816
 Hailuoto Island
 Kempele

References

External links
 
 Municipality of Oulunsalo – Official website 

Populated coastal places in Finland
Municipalities of North Ostrobothnia
Populated places established in 1882
Former municipalities of Finland
Oulunsalo